Claudine Bertrand (born 4 July 1948) is a Quebec educator and poet.

Life
Bertrand was born in Montreal and studied at the Université du Québec à Montréal, where she received a Master's degree in literary studies. Bertrand taught literature at college level from 1973. She contributed to a number of magazines, including Montréal now!, La Nouvelle Barre du jour, Les Écrits, Hobo- Québec, Possibles, Rampike, Moebius, Estuaire, Écritures, Tessera, Bacchanales and Acte Sud. In 1981, Bertrand founded the magazine Arcade, later recognized for its contributions to cultural exchange between Quebec and France. She created the Prix de la relève Arcade in 1991. She also contributed to the French literary magazines Le Jardin d'Essai, Travers and Pourtours.

Awards and honours
In 1996, she was a finalist for the Grand Prix du Conseil des Arts de la Communauté urbaine de Montréal for her contributions to the Montreal cultural scene. In 1997, she received the Prix Femme de mérite, in the arts and culture section. In 2010, she was awarded the Grand Prix international des poètes francophones for her collected work.

Selected works

Poetry collections 
 Idole errante (1983)
 Memory (1985)
 Fiction-nuit (1987)
 La Passion au féminin (1994)
 Une main contre le délire (1995), finalist for the Grand Prix du festival international de poésie
 L'Amoureuse intérieure, suivi de La montagne sacrée (1997), received the Prix de la Société des écrivains canadiens and the Prix de la Renaissance française
 La Dernière Femme (2000)
 Le Corps en tête (2001), received the Prix Tristan-Tzara
 L'Énigme du futur (2001), received the Prix international Saint-Denys-Garneau
 The Last Woman (2008), translated into English
 Autour de l'obscur (2008)

References

External links 
 

1948 births
Living people
Canadian poets in French
Canadian women poets
20th-century Canadian poets
21st-century Canadian poets
Writers from Montreal
Université du Québec à Montréal alumni
20th-century Canadian women writers
21st-century Canadian women writers